The Harelle (from haro) was a revolt that occurred in the French city of Rouen in 1382 and followed by the Maillotins uprising a few days later in Paris, as well as numerous other revolts across France in the subsequent week. France was in the midst of the Hundred Years' War, and had seen decades of warfare, widespread destruction, high taxation, and economic decline, made worse by bouts of plague. In Rouen, the second largest city in the kingdom, the effects of the war were particularly felt.

Tensions had been building nationally for nearly a year following the death of Charles V; on his deathbed he repealed many of the war taxes he had previously imposed. With the re-imposition of the taxes months later, a localized revolt, led by Rouen's guilds, occurred in the city and was followed by many similar such incidents across the kingdom. Charles VI traveled with an army led by his uncle and regent, Philip the Bold, Duke of Burgundy, from Paris. Paris itself revolted shortly after the army left the city. After returning to Paris to deal with the rebels there, the Duke and King traveled with an army to Rouen to end the revolt. The leaders of the Harelle in Rouen feared execution on the scale that occurred in Paris, and resolved to not resist the army. Twelve leaders of the revolt were executed, the city's rights were revoked, it was put under the rule of a royal governor, and a fine of 100,000 francs was imposed. Despite the victory, the King was unable to re-enforce the taxation that prompted the revolt, and spent most of the next two years putting down similar tax revolts around the kingdom that followed the example of Rouen. The Harelle was one of many popular revolts in late medieval Europe, including the English peasants' revolt of 1381 one year earlier, all part of a larger crisis of the Late Middle Ages.

Background

Charles V, King of France died in 1380 and on his deathbed repealed all of the royal taxes at the suggestion of his confessor, to better prepare his soul for the afterlife. France was in the midst of the Hundred Years War with England. The kingdom was entirely dependent upon the royal taxes for the prosecution of the war effort, and their repeal resulted in the collapse of the war effort for a period of time. Complicating matters was that Charles' successor, Charles VI, was a minor and was under the regency of his three uncles, the Dukes of Burgundy, Berry, and Anjou. Louis, Duke of Anjou was the senior regent, but the three disagreed on policies for France. The plague and war had ravaged the kingdom, and the heavy taxation increased poverty in many parts of the country. The cities were particularly affected, as people abandoned the countryside for the security of the larger walled cities. England was having similar financial difficulties, and the high taxation led to the Peasants' Revolt there in 1381.

By 1382 an agreement for managing the country had been agreed to, with Philip, Duke of Burgundy left to manage the administration. After several failed attempts to have taxation approved by the councils and estates general of the numerous French principalities, the Duke resolved to reimpose the gabelle, a sales tax on salt, and the aides, a customs duty. The representatives of Paris were summoned before the King on January 16 and individually pressured to approve the imposition of the new tax. Under duress they agreed, but the news only gradually became known to the public. The Duke, as was customary at the time, appointed tax farmers to collect the tax.

Rouen

The first violence to break out as a result of the re-imposition of the taxes occurred in Rouen, the second largest city in the kingdom. On February 24, a group of men led by draper Jean le Gras, began sounding the great bells of the city's commune. Another group of men seized and closed the gates of the city, and a large mob quickly filled the streets. The mob was drawn largely from the poorest section of the city and was referred to as "la merdaille" (meaning approximately "shit-stinking rabble") by a local chronicler. The initial target of the mob was the wealthy, the town's councillors, the churches, and the tax farmers. Few people were killed, but there was widespread destruction. The mob looted every major building in the city. As the day progressed, the leaders of the mob directed the attack against any building thought to contain public records. All records containing evidence of rents, lawsuits, debts, rights and privileges were destroyed. 

A mob left the city and attacked the nearby Abbey of St. Ouen where they destroyed the gallows and entered the abbey to recover the city's charter, which had been granted to the city by Louis X after a similar rebellion in 1315. The abbot managed to escape to a nearby castle, but a large part of the abbey was destroyed. The charter was put on a large pole and paraded around the city. It granted significant individual rights to the citizens, but the document was rarely enforced in the normal times. The leaders of the city were rounded up and forced to take an oath and swear to abide by the charter. The riots lasted three days. The Archbishop of Rouen William V de Lestranges, who held feudal rights over the city, was captured and forced to renounce his claims to the city.

The Duke of Burgundy recruited a small army from the garrisons in and around Paris and set out for Rouen accompanied by Charles VI and several other high officials. After being gone from the city only two days, they learnt that a far more violent revolt had broken out in Paris, and quickly turned the army to return to the capital.

Paris
On March 3, the tax farmers began to collect the new tax in Paris. Violence began in the market of Les Halles. About five hundred men attacked collector's booths, beating several collectors to death. The mob quickly grew into the thousands and attacked the Place de Grève in search of weapons. They located a large store of iron mallets; Jean Froissart coined the term "maillotins", so naming their revolt. The newly armed mob spread out across the city attacking buildings where anything of value was thought to be. Churches, businesses, the homes of the wealthy, and government buildings were all looted. The hôtel of the Duke of Anjou was seized and used as a headquarters. The mob began to attack wealthy individuals, government officials, business owners, and moneylenders, beating them to death. The riot quickly degenerated into a pogrom, and the Jewish section of the city was attacked. Hundreds of Jews were murdered, their children forcibly baptized. 

The city's royal captain, Maurise de Treseguidy, led his small contingent in an attempt to stem the violence. The mob quickly ran chains across the streets and began to attack the soldiers, who were forced to flee. The government of the city fled along with most of the royal administration and met with the King and the returning army. What military forces remained held onto the Grand Châtelet, a fortified royal building in the city.

When the king arrived at the gates of Paris on March 5, the Duke of Burgundy negotiated with leaders of the mob from the city walls. They offered to submit and allow the king to reenter the city if he met three conditions: abolish all royal taxes, release certain individuals imprisoned by the Duke in recent months, and grant amnesty to everyone who had been involved in the Parisian revolt. The Duke replied that the King would release the prisoners, but not meet their other demands. Fresh violence immediately erupted in the city. The mob attacked the Chatelet and killed several soldiers who were unable to escape. The prisons of the city were opened and everyone released. During the night, however, the mob faded away and leaders of the city's guilds took control of the situation. They too refused to open the gates and offered to negotiate with the King. The King and his army seized posts overlooking the city and stopped river traffic into the city, cutting off its primary source of food. The Duke of Burgundy summoned a large army of retainers from his domains, and the Dukes of Brittany and Anjou sent forces to assist in suppressing the rebellion.

Resolution
News of the revolts in Rouen and Paris spread across France, and many other places followed suit. Amiens, Dieppe, Falaise, Caen, Orléans, and Rheims were all seized by rebels who followed the pattern established by Rouen and Paris. The cities were looted, the wealthy persecuted, the Jews proscribed, and public records destroyed. More revolts occurred across the south of France, and the Estates of Languedoc who were meeting to consider granting a new tax, dispersed without making the much needed grant. Phoebus Gaston, Count of Foix, repudiated the lieutenancy of the Duke of Berry over southern France and raised an army set up his own administration after seizing Toulouse. The largely autonomous areas of Provence, Brittany, and Burgundy, where the royal government had no taxing authority, were the only parts of the country to avoid a revolt. Tax collection became impossible which in turn made raising a substantial army to deal with the revolution nearly impossible, forcing the royal council to compromise. The King agreed to repeal the taxes and offered amnesty to all those involved, but they were required to submit to mediation. After regaining admittance to Paris, the leaders of the Parisian revolt were rounded up and executed.

With control of Paris reestablished, the King and the Duke took the army and again set out for Rouen. The city put up no resistance and opened the gates when the king arrived on March 29. Their leaders feared execution, but most were spared. Only twelve leaders of the revolt were executed, the city's bells were confiscated, the gates of the city symbolically thrown down, a 100,000 franc fine imposed, the city charter was revoked and Rouen was put under the administration of a royal governor. 

The government was unable to reimpose the taxes needed to continue the war effort in the short term, and considerable effort had to be put forth to reassert authority in all the cities were revolts had occurred. The king refused to call a meeting of the Estates General, but numerous local councils were summoned to meet in Compiègne, where minor taxation concessions were made to partially fund the war effort. Over the course of the next year the Duke of Burgundy set forth a plan to strengthen the government's position and gradually arrested and executed their opponents. It was not until 1387 that the last of the issue of taxation was finally resolved, in favor of the king. The collapse of government revenues hastened the government to negotiate the Truce of Leulinghem, a long truce lasting several years with the English while they attempted to reassert their power.

References

Sources

External links
The Harelle Revolt

Conflicts in 1382
1382 in Europe
1380s in France
14th-century rebellions
History of Rouen
Popular revolt in late-medieval Europe
Rebellions in France
Hundred Years' War
Tax resistance in France
Medieval anti-Jewish pogroms
Massacres of Jews
14th-century massacres
Jewish French history
Antisemitism in France